Wilhelm Leuschner (15 June 1890, in Bayreuth, Bavaria – 29 September 1944, in Berlin-Plötzensee) was a trade unionist and Social Democratic politician. An early opponent of Nazism, he organized underground resistance in the labour movement.  As a result of involvement with the assassination attempt on Hitler in 1944, Leuschner was executed.

Biography 
Born in 1890 to stove fitter Wilhelm Friedrich Leuschner and seamstress Maria Barbara Dehler, Leuschner grew up in poverty.

In 1903, he began an apprenticeship as a wood sculptor. After finishing this in 1907, he joined the trade union and, on the occasion of the Jugendstil (Art Nouveau) Exhibition, he moved to Darmstadt, where he worked in a furniture factory.

In 1910, he joined the Social Democratic Party of Germany (SPD) and became more deeply involved with the union. He also wed Elisabeth Batz in 1911.

After fighting in the First World War on the Eastern Front in 1916, he became a city councillor and Chairman of the Darmstadt Unions in 1919. In 1924, he became a member of the Hesse Legislature (Landtag) for the SPD. In 1928 he became Hesse's interior minister. In the Landtag at that time, Leuschner often found himself at odds with jurist and fellow Landtag member Dr. Werner Best, who represented the NSDAP, and would later go on to become very prominent in the Nazi régime. In January 1933, Leuschner was elected to the board of the General German Trade Union Federation.

In April 1933, after the Nazis had seized power in Germany, Leuschner was forced to resign, and gave up his office of Hessian Interior Minister. The following May brought Leuschner's arrest in the course of the Nazis' union-breaking programme. In June, he was arrested once again, mistreated, and held for a year in prisons and concentration camps (Börgermoor and Lichtenburg).

In June 1934, he was released from the concentration camp and began to build up a resistance network. In 1936, he took over a small manufacturing workshop which produced pub utensils, but it soon became the hub of the "illegal Reich leadership of German unions".

Leuschner struggled actively in those resistance groups close to the unions and maintained contact with the Kreisau Circle, and from 1939, also with the resistance group around Carl Friedrich Goerdeler. After the planned coup d'état, Leuschner was most likely to become Germany's vice-chancellor; however, Claus von Stauffenberg's 20 July 1944 attempt on Hitler's life at the Wolf's Lair in East Prussia failed.

Leuschner was arrested on 16 August 1944, and was brought before the Volksgerichtshof, where he was sentenced to death. The sentence was carried out on 29 September 1944 at Plötzensee Prison in Berlin.

Numerous schools, streets, and squares are named after Leuschner, including a school in Darmstadt and a square and accompanying railway station in Leipzig. As of January 2018, according to Zeit Online, there were 158 streets, paths, and squares in Germany named after Leuschner.

The Germany state of Hesse awards a medal named "Wilhelm-Leuschner-Medaille".

See also
 List of members of the 20 July plot

References

Sources
 Biography

External links
 
 Wilhelm Leuschner Foundation 

1890 births
1944 deaths
People from Bayreuth
People from the Kingdom of Bavaria
Social Democratic Party of Germany politicians
People condemned by Nazi courts
Executed German Resistance members
People from Bavaria executed at Plötzensee Prison
Executed members of the 20 July plot
Börgermoor concentration camp survivors
Members of the Landtag of Hesse-Darmstadt